Coast Guard Air Station Corpus Christi is an Air Station of the United States Coast Guard located in Corpus Christi, Texas.  The Station is co-located with Sector Corpus Christi offices at Corpus Christi International Airport . The Coast Guard Air Detachment was established on 20 November 1950, and served the entire western Gulf of Mexico with one PBY-5 Catalina fixed wing aircraft, and four pilots. In 1965, the detachment was formally designated USCG Air Station Corpus Christi. Early aircraft consisted of HU-16E Albatross, HH-52A Seaguard helicopter, HC-131 Samaritan, and HU-25A fanjet's. Following extensive personnel and equipment changes in the operations department, the air station became fully operational on October 15, 1980, and operated as one of thirteen Coast Guard Group units between Port O'Connor, Texas and the Mexican border. The Station, maintained a 24-hour Search and rescue capability, with the use of three HH-52A helicopters and three HU-25A fanjets. The Unit averaged over 400 rescues a year, which included searches for overdue vessels, assisting sinking or disabled boats, and medical evacuations from offshore oil rigs. In the spring of 1986 the station's HH-52s were replaced with the Aérospatiale HH-65 Dolphin helicopter. In May 2005 the Coast Guard commissioned Air station Corpus Christi to combine all the units within the area of Port Lavaca to Brownsville under one unified command.

References

External links

United States Coast Guard Air Stations
1950 establishments in Texas